The Cumberland Building Society was established on 16 April 1850 as the Cumberland Co-operative Land and Benefit Building Society. It has its headquarters in Carlisle, Cumbria, England. It is the 10th largest in the United Kingdom based on total assets of £2.5 billion as at 31 March 2018. 

The first branch was opened 100 miles south of Cumberland in Preston, Lancashire. It is a member of the Building Societies Association.

The society offers a range of products including: savings accounts; mortgages; investment accounts; loans and further loans; financial services; insurance products; lending to commercial enterprises, through the Commercial Lending division; and Internet banking.

The society owns several subsidiary companies, including Cumberland Estate Agents Ltd, and Borderway Finance.

Other than Nationwide Building Society, Cumberland is the only other society to offer a full current account service with ATMs, Visa cards and Internet banking. It also offers fee-free foreign currency transactions.

In 2014 the Cumberland became the first UK building society to offer a mobile payments service linked to a mobile phone number, called Pay2Mobile. It became part of the national Paym mobile payments service later that year.

Formation of the Society

The Cumberland has its origins as one of the freehold land societies common at the time. The format was pioneered in 1847 by the Birmingham Freehold Land Society and one of the noted exponents was the National Building Society in 1849 (better known as one half of the Abbey National).  The Cumberland was originally launched as the Cumberland Co-operative Land and Benefit Building Society but, as with the National, it was required to remove “Land” from its legal name as a requirement of registration under the 1836 Benefit Building Societies Act. However, at its first AGM, the Society still referred to itself as The Cumberland Freehold Land Society. The formation of the Cumberland was associated with the “forty shilling freeholders movement” (whereby voting rights could be secured by the possession of freehold land with an annual value of £2)   although the emphasis of the inaugural publicity and meetings was on the benefits of co-operative purchase and development of land. One of the declared objectives of the Society was “to supply at wholesale prices, allotments of freehold land, adapted to confer a vote for the county – such allotment to be paid for by small weekly subscriptions.”  Having bought the land, the Society carried out all the functions of a developer, laying out streets, providing sewerage, fencing etc. selling the serviced plots to individuals at the wholesale price. Within weeks of its formation, the Society had 1260 members and by the end of the year it had acquired two estates, Edentown and Belle View.

Branch locations 
Ambleside,
Annan,
Appleby-In-Westmorland*,
Aspatria,
Barrow-in-Furness*,
Brampton*,
Carlisle*,
Cleator Moor,
Cockermouth*,
Dalston,
Dumfries*,
Egremont,
Gretna,
Haltwistle,
Kendal*,
Keswick*,
Lancaster*
Langholm,
Lockerbie,
Longtown,
Maryport,
Penrith*,
Preston*,
Silloth,
Ulverston*,
Whitehaven*,
Wigton,
Windermere,
Workington*,

 * Denotes estate agents as well

References

External links
Cumberland Building Society
Building Societies Association
KPMG Building Societies Database 2008

Building societies of England
Banks established in 1850
Organizations established in 1850
Companies based in Carlisle, Cumbria
Organisations based in Cumbria
1850 establishments in England